William Marston may refer to:

 William Moulton Marston (1893–1947), American psychologist, inventor and comic book writer who created the character Wonder Woman
 William H. Marston (1835–1926), early resident of Berkeley, California